2018 State Basketball League season may refer to:

2018 MSBL season, Men's SBL season
2018 WSBL season, Women's SBL season